The 2021 Everest Canadian Curling Club Championships were held from November 29 to December 4 at the Ottawa Hunt and Golf Club in Ottawa, Ontario.

Men

Teams
The teams are listed as follows:

Round-robin standings
Final round-robin standings

Round-robin results

All draws are listed in Eastern Time (UTC−05:00).

Draw 2
Monday, November 29, 7:30 pm

Draw 3
Tuesday, November 30, 9:00 am

Draw 4
Tuesday, November 30, 12:30 pm

Draw 5
Tuesday, November 30, 4:00 pm

Draw 6
Tuesday, November 30, 7:30 pm

Draw 7
Wednesday, December 1, 9:00 am

Draw 8
Wednesday, December 1, 12:30 pm

Draw 9
Wednesday, December 1, 4:00 pm

Draw 10
Wednesday, December 1, 7:30 pm

Draw 11
Thursday, December 2, 9:00 am

Draw 13
Thursday, December 2, 4:00 pm

Championship round

A Bracket

B Bracket

A Event

Semifinals
Friday, December 3, 9:00 am

Friday, December 3, 12:30 pm

Finals
Friday, December 3, 12:30 pm

Friday, December 3, 4:00 pm

B Event

Semifinals
Friday, December 3, 12:30 pm

Friday, December 3, 4:00 pm

Finals
Friday, December 3, 7:30 pm

Playoffs

Semifinals
Saturday, December 4, 9:00 am

Bronze medal game
Saturday, December 4, 2:00 pm

Gold medal game
Saturday, December 4, 2:00 pm

Women

Teams
The teams are listed as follows:

Round-robin standings
Final round-robin standings

Round-robin results

All draws are listed in Eastern Time (UTC−05:00).

Draw 1
Monday, November 29, 3:00 pm

Draw 3
Tuesday, November 30, 9:00 am

Draw 4
Tuesday, November 30, 12:30 pm

Draw 5
Tuesday, November 30, 4:00 pm

Draw 6
Tuesday, November 30, 7:30 pm

Draw 7
Wednesday, December 1, 9:00 am

Draw 8
Wednesday, December 1, 12:30 pm

Draw 9
Wednesday, December 1, 4:00 pm

Draw 10
Wednesday, December 1, 7:30 pm

Draw 12
Thursday, December 2, 12:30 pm

Draw 14
Thursday, December 2, 7:30 pm

Championship round

A Bracket

B Bracket

A Event

Semifinals
Friday, December 3, 9:00 am

Friday, December 3, 12:30 pm

Finals
Friday, December 3, 12:30 pm

Friday, December 3, 4:00 pm

B Event

Semifinals
Friday, December 3, 12:30 pm

Friday, December 3, 4:00 pm

Finals
Friday, December 3, 7:30 pm

Playoffs

Semifinals
Saturday, December 4, 9:00 am

Bronze medal game
Saturday, December 4, 2:00 pm

Gold medal game
Saturday, December 4, 2:00 pm

References

External links

2021 in Canadian curling
2021 in Ontario
November 2021 sports events in Canada
December 2021 sports events in Canada
Curling in Ottawa
Canadian Curling Club Championships